Kalidasa Kalakendram  is a professional drama theatrical group founded by O. Madhavan, a well-known Malayalam theatre director, in Kollam, Kerala. The group was founded on 25 January 1963 as a society under the parent organisation, Paul Foundation.

History
The city of Kollam in Kerala is well known for its affinity to drama and drama theaters. There were more than 450 drama troupes in Kollam in the past. Kalidasa Kalakendram is one among them, founded by thespian O. Madhavan on 25 January 1963 with the support of O. N. V. Kurup, Vaikom Chandrasekharan Nair and Devarajan Master. Now the troupe is managed by Sandhya Rajendran(daughter of O. Madhavan), E. A. Rajendran(son-in-law of O. Madhavan), Actor Mukesh(son of O. Madhavan), Jayasree Syamlal(daughter of O. Madhavan) and Syamlal(son-in-law of O. Madhavan).

Famous plays by Kalidasa Kalakendram

 Aagamam
 Chakravarthy
 Chakravyooham
 Circus
 Deepthi
 Doctor
 Hamsageetham
 Janani Janmabhoomi
 Kaakkapponnu
 Kadalpalam
 Kadannalkoodu
 Karuna
 Kuttavum Sikshayum
 Macbeth
 Muthuchippi
 Pravaham
 Rainbow
 Rakthanakshathram
 Rashtrabhavan
 Sangamam
 Sankhumudra
 Simhanaadam
 Swantham Lekhakan
 Thanneer Panthal
 Theeram
 Thuramukham
 Yamuna
 Yudhabhoomi
 Vilambaram

Movies
In 2012, Kalidasa Kalakendram ventured into film production through the Malayalam movie Hide n' Seek, directed by Anil. Divyadarshan, the grandson of O. Madhavan, played the lead role in the movie. The movie production house of Kalidasa Kalakendram was named as Kalidasa International Movies.

Gallery

References

Organisations based in Kollam
Arts of Kerala
Arts organisations based in India
Theatrical organisations in India
Performing arts in India
1963 establishments in Kerala
Culture of Kollam
Arts organizations established in 1963